Fissurella mutabilis, common name the Cape keyhole limpet, is a species of sea snail, a marine gastropod mollusk in the family Fissurellidae, the keyhole limpets.

Description
The size of the shell reaches 18 mm.

Distribution
Fissurella mutabilis is commonly found off the coast in Madagascar, Namibia, and South Africa.

References

External links
 

Fissurellidae
Gastropods described in 1834